Triazabicyclodecene (1,5,7-triazabicyclo[4.4.0]dec-5-ene or TBD) is an organic compound consisting of a bicyclic guanidine. For a charge-neutral compound, it is a relatively strong base that is effectively for a variety of organic transformations.  TBD is colorless solid that is soluble in a variety of solvents.

Reactivity

As a strong base, TBD fully deprotonates most phenols, carboxylic acids, and some C-acids. It catalyzes a variety of reactions including Michael reactions, Henry reactions (nitroaldol reactions),  transesterification reactions, and Knoevenagel condensations.

Deprotonation at the 7-position gives a particularly electron-rich  ligand as manifested in the redox properties of ditungsten tetra(hpp).

See also
 1,8-Diazabicyclo(5.4.0)undec-7-ene, a structurally related strong base
 7-Methyl-TBD, a methyl derivative of TBD

References

Catalysts
Guanidines
Pyrimidopyrimidines
Amines
Heterocyclic compounds
Reagents for organic chemistry